Cordylospasta opaca is a blister beetle that occurs in arid regions central and southern California. Males are fully winged and reach a length of 12 mm, while females are flightless with reduced elytra and reach a length of 19 mm. Cordylospasta fulleri is almost identical, but occurs in the Great Basin and has 8-10 antennal segments, while Cordylospasta opaca should have 11 antennal segments.

References 

Meloidae
Beetles of North America